Stewart Run is a tributary of the West Branch Octoraro Creek in Lancaster County, Pennsylvania, in the United States.

Course
Stewart Run rises in a small valley and flows west. It passes under US Route 222 near Solanco High School before turning southwest. The stream receives two small unnamed tributaries from the right and turns south for several tenths of a mile. It receives an unnamed tributary from the left. It turns southwest and receives another tributary from the left before its confluence with West Branch Octoraro Creek.

Stewart Run joins the West Branch Octoraro Creek  upriver of its mouth.

Geography and geology

The stream's watershed is part of the Piedmont region, characterized by rolling hills. The lower  of the stream is designated a Scenic River.

Watershed
Its mouth is in the United States Geological Survey quadrangle of Kirkwood. Its source is in the quadrangle of Wakefield. Most of the watershed is in an agricultural area. There are several waterfalls on the creek.

History
Stewart Run was entered into the Geographic Names Information System on August 2, 1979. Its identifier in the Geographic Names Information System is 1188650.

Biology and recreation
The Theodore A. Parker III Natural Area, a 100-acre park named after the famed ornithologist, is adjacent to the creek. Several hiking trails in the park follow the creek. Fishing is allowed within designated seasons. Stewart Run supports flora including trout lilies, violets, mayapple, club mosses, ground pine, ferns and lichens. Animals in the watershed include birds, deer, raccoons, opossums, and brown and brook trout.

See also
List of Pennsylvania rivers

References

Rivers of Pennsylvania
Tributaries of the Susquehanna River
Rivers of Lancaster County, Pennsylvania